Democratic Movement (MD) was a political party in San Marino.

History
The party contested national elections for the first time in 1993, when it received 5.3% of the vote, winning two of the 60 seats in the Grand and General Council. In the 1998 elections it was succeeded by the Ideas in Motion party.

References

Defunct political parties in San Marino
Political parties with year of establishment missing
Political parties with year of disestablishment missing